The women's 400 metres hurdles event at the 2018 African Championships in Athletics was held on 4 and 5 August in Asaba, Nigeria.

Gold medalist Glory Onome Nathaniel tested positive for Stanozolol and her results were voided.

Medalists

Results

Heats
Qualification: First 3 of each heat (Q) and the next 2 fastest (q) qualified for the final.

Final

References

2018 African Championships in Athletics
400 metres hurdles at the African Championships in Athletics